Suicide in India is a national social issue. In the year 2020, India recorded 153,052 suicides, an increase of 10% from 2019's 139,123 suicides. This is a list of States and Union Territories of India ranked according to suicide rate as on 2020. The rate is calculated as number of suicides per 1 lakh (100,000) people. The list is compiled from the 2020 Accidental Deaths and Suicides in India report published by National Crime Records Bureau (NCRB), Government of India.

In 2015, the top three States with highest suicide rates were Puducherry, Sikkim and Andaman and Nicobar Islands respectively, while Bihar recorded lowest suicide rates. In 2020, the top three States with highest suicide rates were Andaman and Nicobar Islands, Sikkim and Chhattisgarh respectively, while Bihar recorded lowest suicide rates.

States by Suicide Rate

Notes

References

Suicide rate
Suicide rate
Lists of subdivisions of India
Suicides in India
India, suicide rate